Sarangwal is a village in Shahkot in Jalandhar district of Punjab State, India. The village is administrated by a sarpanch who is an elected representative of village as per Panchayati raj (India).

Demography 
As of 2011, Qadian has a total number of 167 houses and population of 789 of which include 414 are males while 375 are females according to the report published by Census India in 2011. Literacy rate of the village is 74.82%, lower than state average of 75.84%. The population of children under the age of 6 years is 82 which is 10.39% of total population of the village, and child sex ratio is approximately 952 higher than state average of 846.

Most of the people are from Schedule Caste which constitutes 65.27% of total population in the village. The town does not have any Schedule Tribe population so far.

As per census 2011, 325 people were engaged in work activities out of the total population of the village which includes 264 males and 61 females. According to census survey report 2011, 77.23% workers describe their work as main work and 22.77% workers are involved in marginal activity providing livelihood for less than 6 months.

Transport 
Shahkot Malisian station is the nearest train station.

See also 
List of villages in India

References 

Villages in Jalandhar district